Do It Any Way You Wanna is a 1975 crossover hit by the Philadelphia-based R&B/dance group, The People's Choice, written and produced by Leon Huff. and recorded and mixed by Jay Mark. "Do It Any Way You Wanna" was a gold record for The People's Choice.

Chart performance
The single made it to #1 on the soul singles chart for one week and crossed over to the pop singles chart, peaking at #11. "Do It Any Way You Wanna" was also successful on the disco/dance charts, hitting #3.

Cover Versions
The song was covered by rapper Guru on the 1993 soundtrack album Addams Family Values: Music from the Motion Picture.

Samples
It formed the basis of the 1977 reggae hit "Cocaine in My Brain" by Dillinger, featuring Sly and Robbie.

References

1975 singles
1975 songs
Disco songs
Songs written by Leon Huff